Princess Salwa Aga Khan (née  Kendra Irene Spears; born August 5, 1988) is an American fashion model. She began her modelling career in 2008, participating in the Ford Models Supermodel of the World and walking in New York Fashion Week. She has walked the runway for Gucci, Christian Lacroix, Lanvin, Hermès, and Valentino. Salwa has appeared on the covers of Amica, Cover Magazine, Vogue China, Vogue Japan, Vogue Germany, Vogue México y Latinoamérica, Elle, Allure, and Numero and in editorials in Dazed & Confused, V, and Vogue Italia. She has been the face of Prada, Armani's Code Fragrance, and Moschino's Pink Bouquet fragrance and modelled in advertisement campaigns for Calvin Klein, Etro, Diane von Fürstenberg, Peek & Cloppenburg, The Limited.

In 2013, she married Prince Rahim Aga Khan, the eldest son of Aga Khan IV, at the Château de Bellerive in Switzerland. Upon her marriage, she converted to Islam and adopted the name Salwa, meaning "solace" in Arabic. She and Prince Rahim have two sons. They divorced  in February 2022.

Early life and education
Kendra Irene Spears was born on August 5, 1988, in Seattle, Washington. She graduated from South Kitsap High School with an Associate's Degree acquired through a dual-credit high school and college program (Running Start). She then attended Portland State University to study Sociology, and obtained a BA in sociology from the University of Washington. In January 2008, Salwa began her modeling career in New York City and went on to become a successful fashion model.

Career
In January 2008, Salwa participated in the Ford Models Supermodel of the World competition, after winning a modeling contest via MySpace. After the competition ended, she gained a contract with Ford Models of New York and debuted at New York Fashion Week in September 2008. After success in New York, Salwa went on to walk for the most prestigious designers in Milan and Paris, including Gucci, Christian Lacroix, Lanvin, Hermès, and Valentino.

Shortly after the show season ended in October, Salwa appeared on a succession of covers of the Danish fashion magazine Cover and the Italian magazine Amica. The covers were followed by a Dazed & Confused editorial featuring new faces of the season as well as editorials for V and Vogue Italia.

For the Fall 2009 season, Salwa was photographed by Steven Meisel as one of the faces of Prada. Shortly afterwards, she moved back to Seattle to complete her degree at University of Washington. Although the move limited her ability to work, she still managed to shoot advertising campaigns including Stefanel shot by Mario Testino, Calvin Klein shot by Alasdair McLellan, The Limited shot by Patrick Demarchelier, Etro, and Diane von Fürstenberg.

Throughout Salwa's career, she has been photographed for the cover of a number of Vogue magazines worldwide, including Vogue China, Vogue Japan, Vogue Germany, and Vogue Mexico. She has also appeared on the covers of international editions of Elle, Allure, and Numero and in adverts for Calvin Klein, Diane von Fürstenberg, Peek & Cloppenburg, Etro, and The Limited.

Salwa was the face of Armani Code Fragrance and Moschino Pink Bouquet Fragrance in 2012.

Married life
On April 26, 2013, Aga Khan IV announced the engagement of his eldest son, Prince Rahim Aga Khan, to Kendra Spears. The couple married on August 31, 2013, at the Château de Bellerive, Geneva. This was formerly the home of Prince Sadruddin Aga Khan, his half great-uncle, and Princess Aliya.
The bride has since been known as Princess Salwa.

On October 29, 2014, it was announced that the princess was expecting her first child with Prince Rahim. On April 14, 2015, His Highness The Aga Khan announced to the Ismaili community that on April 11, 2015, Princess Salwa had given birth to a healthy baby boy, her first child, Prince Irfan Aga Khan, in Geneva. The name Irfan in Arabic means gnosis, or knowledge of the divine. A second son was born in London on January 2, 2017, and is known as Prince Sinan. 

The couple divorced in February 2022.

References

External links

 The Internet Fashion Database

Living people
1988 births
American Ismailis
Female models from Washington (state)
Portland State University alumni
American female models
University of Washington College of Arts and Sciences alumni
Princesses by marriage
Converts to Islam
Noorani family